Central School District (Central SD 13J) is a public school district located in Independence, Oregon. The district consists of Ash Creek Elementary School, Independence Elementary School, Monmouth Elementary School, Talmadge Middle School, and Central High School.

References 

Education in Polk County, Oregon
School districts in Oregon